Birger (Swedish: Birger Magnusson; 1280 – 31 May 1321) was King of Sweden from 1290 to 1318.

Background
Birger was the son of King Magnus III of Sweden and Hedwig of Holstein. He was hailed king of Sweden when he was four years old. This was done by his father in order to secure the succession. In 1275, King Magnus had led  a rebellion against his elder brother, King Valdemar, and ousted him from the throne. Before his death, King Magnus ordered his kinsman, Torkel Knutsson, the Constable of the Realm, to be the guardian of his son Birger. In 1302, Birger was crowned at Söderköping after marrying Martha of Denmark, the daughter of King Eric V of Denmark.

Reign
Birger was only ten years old when his father died, at which time Torkel Knutsson was the most influential statesman in Sweden. In 1293, Torkel Knutsson led the Swedes to a victory which won a part of western Karelia. This expedition has traditionally been dubbed as the Third Swedish Crusade. When Torkel Knutsson returned from leading the crusade in Finland, a feud had developed between the brothers. Torkel Knutsson supported King Birger.

Birger came of age when there was a conflict within the Church of Sweden over interpretation of the Privileges of 1280, which had been the cost of the support of the Church for his father's usurpation. The king's brothers Erik Magnusson, Duke of Södermanland and Valdemar Magnusson, Duke of Finland took advantage of this conflict. Duke Eric tried to establish an independent kingdom around Bohuslän, which he had received as part of his marriage to the Norwegian princess Ingeborg, and Halland at the boundary between Sweden, Norway and Denmark. A civil war broke out, but by 1306 emotions had cooled to the point where the dukes acknowledged the son of Birger, Magnus Birgersson, as the successor to the throne. Torkel Knutsson, who was Duke Valdemar's father-in-law, was executed in 1306 as a token of reconciliation between King Birger and his brothers. The same year, in an event known as the Håtuna games (Håtunaleken), Birger was taken captive by his brothers on the Håtuna royal estate in Uppland and taken as prisoner to Nyköping Castle (Nyköpingshus).

In 1308, Eric and Valdemar were forced by the Danish king to release King Birger, but they did so under humiliating conditions. When King Birger was free, he sought aid in Denmark, and the strife began anew.  Birger remained king in name, but had to give up the Royal Domain, exchanging it for eastern Uppland, Närke, his brother Erik's former Duchy Södermanland, Östergötland, Gotland and the Castle of Viborg.

In 1312,  Duke Eric married Ingeborg of Norway, daughter of King Haakon V of Norway  in a double wedding in Oslo.  At the same time, Eric's brother Duke Valdemar married Ingeborg Eriksdottir of Norway, the daughter of King Eric II of Norway.

Duke Erik also held Bohuslän from Norway as well as northern Halland and was creating a separate kingdom centered on Göta älv. In 1317 however, Birger captured his brothers during the Nyköping Banquet (Nyköpings gästabud), which led to their death. According to Eric's Chronicle (Erikskrönikan), the dukes were starved to death in a cellar of Nyköping Castle.

Birger was ousted by his brothers' supporters in 1318 and eventually went into exile under his brother-in-law King Eric VI of Denmark, taking the Royal Archives with him. His 18-year-old son Magnus had arrived that year with Danish troops to save Birger but an army under Canute Porse defeated them at Söderköping, practically putting an end to the conflict. Birger first fled to Gotland and left Magnus to defend the important Stegeborg Castle. Magnus was captured there only to be executed in Stockholm in 1320, with a younger brother Eric having died the year before and ex-king Birger dying in Denmark the year after. In 1319, the three-year-old son of Duke Erik, King Magnus VII of Norway, had then already been hailed King of Sweden after the short regency of his mother Duchess Ingeborg.

Children
 Magnus Birgersson (1300–1320)
 Eric Birgersson
 Agnes Birgersdotter
 Katarina Birgersdotter

Modern depiction
In 2003, the band Falconer released The Sceptre of Deception, a concept album based on this period of Swedish history. The album  covers events during the reign of King Birger of Sweden and lengthy strife with his brothers, and the Danish and Norwegian crowns.

References

Other sources
 Barck, Sven Eric;  Persson, ÅkeKungligt skvaller genom tusen år : En annorlunda bok om svensk historia  (Sundbyberg:  Semic, 2000)
 Lindqvist, Herman  Historien om Sverige. Från islossning till kungarike  (Norstedts: 1997)
Harrison, Dick Jarlens sekel: en berättelse om 1200-talets Sverige (Ordfront. 2002)
 Bergman, Mats Nyköpingshus. En rundvandring i historia och nutid (Almqvist & Wiksell. 1992)
 Mannervik, Cyrus Sagor och sägner – Från Nordens forntid och medeltid (AV Carlsons. 1958)

External links

1280 births
1321 deaths
13th-century Swedish monarchs
14th-century Swedish monarchs
Swedish monarchs of German descent
Rulers of Finland
Medieval child monarchs
Burials at St. Bendt's Church, Ringsted
Sons of kings